Richard Martini (born 26 August 1978) is a French football manager and former player who, as of 2021, is the head coach of Départemental 2 club US La Cadière. As a player, he was a defender, and played professional football for Marseille, Martigues, Lorient, Guingamp, and Châteauroux.

Honours 
Marseille B

 Championnat de France Amateur: 2001–02

Lorient

 Coupe de France: 2001–02
 Coupe de la Ligue runner-up: 2001–02

References 

1978 births
Living people
Footballers from Marseille
French footballers
Association football defenders
Olympique de Marseille players
FC Martigues players
FC Lorient players
En Avant Guingamp players
LB Châteauroux players
Championnat National 2 players
Ligue 1 players
Ligue 2 players
French football managers
Association football coaches
SC Toulon-Le Las non-playing staff
SC Toulon non-playing staff